Huffman is an unincorporated community of northeastern Harris County, Texas within the Houston, Baytown metropolitan area.

Location
David Huffman, a native of Louisiana, came to Texas to fight against Mexico during the Texas Revolution.

In the early years, the economy was driven by farming with primary crops being cotton, rice and corn as well as ranching and logging. A post office was established at the community in 1888, and two blacksmith shops were operating here by 1892. The Beaumont, Sour Lake and Western Railway came through the community in the early 1900s. By 1914 the town reported two general stores and a population of 250. The construction and operation of the Sinclair Oil pump station in 1921 added to the economy. The 1936 county highway map showed a church and cemetery at the townsite. In 1953, Lake Houston was opened as a recreational lake and still serves the area today with boating, water skiing and jetting, fishing and sailing.  
   
Huffman is a community consisting largely of subdivisions, scattered farms, apartments, and small businesses.

Media
Huffman has two community newspapers: The Tribune and The Lake Houston Observer. The metro newspaper is the Houston Chronicle.

Education

Primary and secondary public schools

The Huffman Independent School District is named after the community and, up to 2007, served the area with four schools: Ben Bowen Elementary, Copeland Intermediate, Falcon Ridge Elementary, Huffman Middle School, and Hargrave High School. Since the construction of a new Hargrave High School campus and the renovations of the old middle school, which moved to the old high school campus, the five schools were renamed as follows:
 Ben Bowen Early Childhood Center
 Huffman Elementary School
 Falcon Ridge Elementary School
 Huffman Middle School
 Willie J. Hargrave High School

Public libraries
Harris County Public Library operates the nearby Atascocita Library.

Community college
Residents of Huffman ISD are zoned to Lee College.

Subdivisions
The Commons Of Lake Houston 
Fairway crossings
Idleloch
River Terrace
Cypress point
Huffman Hills
WildWood Hilltop
Tayme Ranchettes
Plantation
Rolling Creek Acres
Pine Way Estates 
Fairway Crossing At Lake Houston
Lazy Pines
Lochshire
Last Stand
Huffman Hollow 
Lake Houston
Forest Manor
Spanish Cove
Saddle Creek Farms
Lakewood Heights
Woodland Lakes

Government and infrastructure
The United States Postal Service operates the Huffman Post Office at 24936Farm to Market Road 2100 Luke W. Burris is the Mayor of Huffman TX.

Harris Health System (formerly Harris County Hospital District) designated E.A. "Squatty" Lyons Medical Center in Humble for ZIP code 77336. The nearest public hospital is Lyndon B. Johnson Hospital in northeast Houston.

Parks and recreation
Harris County Precinct 2 operates the  I.T. May Park at 2100 Wolf Road. The park includes eight lighted baseball fields, two lighted American football fields, concession stands, barbecue pits, picnic areas, two playgrounds, a paved quarter-mile walking trail, and restroom facilities. The park also includes the May Community Center.

Historic 
Huffman is the home to a 347 year old Heritage Live Oak tree. The Huffman Heritage Live Oak reached 75 feet tall with a crown spread of 135 feet in 1989, surpassing the Texas State Forestry Champion Live Oak at Goose Island State Park at Rockport in two of the three criteria. (Goose Island Oak is larger in girth of trunk). The Texas Forestry Service determined the Huffman Heritage Live Oak to be 314 years in 1989, verifying its witness to hundreds of years of Texas history.

References

External links

Unincorporated communities in Harris County, Texas
Unincorporated communities in Texas